Jeong Jae-yong (Hanja:鄭宰溶; born 14 September 1990) is a South Korean footballer who plays as defensive midfielder for Suwon FC.

Career
He was selected by FC Anyang in the 2013 K League draft.
Jeong scored the best Korean goal of the season in FC Anyang.
Jae-yong joined Ulsan Hyundai in summer 2016, and scored two goals in first match of 2017 K League Classic.

On 25 December 2019, it was confirmed that Jae-yong would join the Thai league club Buriram United for the 2020 season.

References

External links 

1990 births
Living people
Association football midfielders
South Korean footballers
FC Anyang players
Ulsan Hyundai FC players
Pohang Steelers players
K League 2 players
K League 1 players
Korea University alumni